Kwon Sang-woo (in Korean: 권상우, Kweon Sang-u; born August 5, 1976) is a South Korean actor. He rose to stardom in 2003 with the romantic comedy film My Tutor Friend and the melodrama series Stairway to Heaven.

Career
Kwon Sang-woo, the most visible example of the so-called mom-zzang (slang for "great body") movement, started his career as a fashion model in the late 1990s. His first acting experience was in the TV drama Delicious Proposal, and for the first few years of his entertainment career, he received only minor roles on television, before making his big-screen debut in the martial arts film Volcano High (2001). The following year, he played his first lead role in the comedy Make It Big (2002) together with real-life best friend Song Seung-heon.

Kwon's breakthrough came in 2003 with the phenomenally successful romantic comedy My Tutor Friend, as a troublesome high school boy who is tutored by a college student of the same age (played by actress Kim Ha-neul). This was followed by appearances in My Good Partner, the world's first movie made for mobile phones, and the music video collection Project X.

His next film released in early 2004 was also a hit. Once Upon a Time in High School portrayed the authoritarian society of the 1970s through a notoriously violent high school. Simultaneously, Kwon's TV tearjerker Stairway to Heaven was winning high ratings over 40%. The drama eventually screened throughout Asia and helped to turn him into a regional star.

However, Kwon's follow-up film Love, So Divine, about a priest in training who falls in love, earned poor reviews and did not get much attention from audiences.

For 2006, Kwon starred in the big-budget action noir Running Wild, about a detective, a prosecutor, and a criminal who are all equally vicious. Running Wild received satisfactory reviews, but disappointing returns, and Kwon's next film Almost Love, a romantic comedy reteaming him with Kim Ha-neul, likewise failed to replicate the success of their previous film.

Thus began Kwon's career slump, as the films Fate and More Than Blue flopped in the box office, and his small-screen projects Sad Love Story, Bad Love, and Cinderella Man received low ratings.

Things took a turn for the better in 2010 with the box-office success of Korean War film 71: Into the Fire which Kwon reportedly did not hesitate to take on, though he again portrayed a high school student. His drama Daemul about Korea's first female president (played by Go Hyun-jung) was also very popular during its run, staying atop TV charts for 11 weeks straight and ending with viewership ratings around 26%.

In the 2011 melodrama Pained, Kwon played a man with analgesia, the inability to sense physical pain, who then falls in love with a woman suffering from hemophilia. Based on an original story by webcomic artist Kang Full, Pained was directed by Kwak Kyung-taek in a departure from his previous macho movies. Kwak said, "The production company told me Kwon Sang-woo was contemplating the part, and I said I would do it only if Kwon does. There was nobody else."

Looking to expand his acting career to a wider audience in Asia, in 2012 Kwon starred in movies with Chinese superstars Cecilia Cheung (romantic comedy Shadows of Love, previously known as Repeat, I Love You) and Jackie Chan (action film CZ12). He also made his singing debut in a DVD released in Japan in 2010. Cast as the male lead in a Chinese TV series titled Feng Hua Xue Yue (Wind Flower Snow Moon), Kwon's role was an Asian-American Broadway producer who comes back to China to stage a musical production in Yunnan Province and falls in love with the leading lady of his stage musical.

He next starred opposite Soo Ae in Yawang (also known as Queen of Ambition), which was adapted from the third installment of manhwa artist Park In-kwon's 21-part saga Daemul (the 2010 SBS TV series of the same name that also starred Kwon was adapted from the comic's second book).

Kwon was cast in his first medical drama in 2013, Medical Top Team from the director of Moon Embracing the Sun and the writer of Brain. He played a straightforward yet warm-hearted genius surgeon. In 2014, he reunited with Stairway to Heaven costar Choi Ji-woo in Temptation, about a married, debt-ridden businessman who agrees to a deal with a female CEO in exchange for her "ownership" of his body.

He next played the owner of an internet startup company in Honey Enemy, a 2015 Chinese romance film opposite Zhang Yuqi that filmed in Jeju Island and Shanghai. Kwon then starred in comedy film The Accidental Detective which revolves around a misfit comic book rental shop owner who becomes involved in a murder case.

In 2016, Kwon starred alongside Choi Kang-hee in the crime comedy drama, Queen of Mystery. Kwon reprised his role in the second season of the show, which aired in 2018.

In 2018, Kwon starred in crime comedy The Accidental Detective 2: In Action. He was also cast in the romantic comedy film Shall We Do It Again. 

Kwon has said in an interview, "I hope I'm remembered as an actor whose work the audience looks forward to rather than an actor who acts well."

Business interests
In 2009 Kwon established the cosmetics firm Natural Tears, of which he is the owner and CEO, as well as the inaugural advertising model for the brand TEARS. It was named after his nickname "Mr. Tears", given to him by fans in recognition of his tear-jerking acting in Stairway to Heaven.

He also opened the cafe Tea'Us in Myeong-dong, and is the biggest shareholder of the resort Ocean Blue Hotel Bali.

Personal life
Unlike many Korean male stars who had to fulfill their mandatory military service at the height of their careers, Kwon completed his military service long before he became an actor.

Kwon's mother is a Roman Catholic, and he himself converted after filming Love, So Divine in which he played as a seminarian. His confirmation name is Francisco.

Kwon married actress and former Miss Korea Son Tae-young at the Shilla Hotel on September 28, 2008. On February 6, 2009, his wife gave birth to a baby boy, christened as Luke (nicknamed Rookie). Their second child, a daughter, was born on January 10, 2015.

Controversy
In 2006 Kwon filed a complaint against Kim Tae-chon, the godfather of Beomseobangpa (one of Korea's three major criminal gangs), for threatening him when the actor failed to keep his promise to hold a fan meeting in Japan. Kwon and the defendant eventually came to a settlement, but prosecutors continued investigations into possible ties between kkangpae and the Japanese Yakuza and Chinese crime syndicates that are looking to cash in on the Korean Wave entertainment business.

There was fan backlash to his 2008 marriage due to his wife's previous dating history. In an appearance on talk show Golden Fishery hosted by Kang Ho-dong in 2009, Kwon said, "After I got married, membership in my fan cafe dwindled from 240,000 to 135,000 - it was like a stock market crash." He also said that before he got married, he had an average of seven TV commercials per year, but by early 2009 that number had dwindled down to zero.

In the early hours of June 12, 2010, Kwon was involved in a car accident in Gangnam District. According to news reports, Kwon was driving on the wrong side of the road and hit a parked car. He then ran into the police car that had pursued him, continued driving and hit a tree before fleeing the scene on foot. Two days later, he turned himself in at Gangnam Police Station, claiming he had not been drunk. Kwon later made a public apology through a handwritten letter, and was fined  by a Seoul district court.

Filmography

Film

Television series

Web series

Television shows

Music video

Ambassadorship 
Seoul Public Relations Ambassador for 2023 S/S Seoul Fashion Week (2022)

Awards and nominations

References

External links 
 

1976 births
Living people
Hannam University alumni
People from Daejeon
21st-century South Korean male actors
South Korean male film actors
South Korean male models
South Korean male television actors
South Korean Roman Catholics
Best New Actor Paeksang Arts Award (film) winners